The 37th Pennsylvania House of Representatives District is located in southeast Pennsylvania and has been represented since 2013 by Mindy Fee.

District profile
The 37th Pennsylvania House of Representatives District is located in Lancaster County and includes the following areas:

 Clay Township
 Elizabeth Township
Lititz
 Manheim
 Penn Township
 Rapho Township
Warwick Township

Representatives

Recent election results

References

External links
District map from the United States Census Bureau
Pennsylvania House Legislative District Maps from the Pennsylvania Redistricting Commission.  
Population Data for District 37 from the Pennsylvania Redistricting Commission.

Government of Lancaster County, Pennsylvania
37